Complete circumferential peripheral and deep margin assessment (CCPDMA) is the preferred method for the removal of certain cancers, especially skin cancers.

There are two forms of CCPDMA surgery: Mohs surgery and surgical excision coupled with margin assessment. Other examples of CCPDMA are found in classical pathology textbooks as techniques of cutting surgical specimens to allow the examination of the inferior and lateral margins of typically elliptical surgical specimens.


Comparison to alternatives 
CCPDMA is superior to standard bread loafing due to very low false negative error rate.  Bread loafing extrapolates the margin exam of a few representative slides to the entire surgical margin. CCPDMA allows for the complete examination of the surgical margin without statistical extrapolation and assumptions.

The first advantage of CCPDMA method is that it allows for the complete examination of the entire surgical margin of the specimen.  The second advantage of CCPDMA is allowing the surgeon to remove only a very small surgical margin.  As the CCPDMA surgery is frequently performed using frozen section pathology, immediate reporting of positive surgical margin is made, and the tumor can be completely removed in the same day. Traditional pathology processing is called "bread loafing", and only allows for the partial examination of the surgical margin.  Some surgeons send the specimen out for processing, and the result of the surgical margin assessment may not be made until days later.

CCPDMA is subject to the basic principles of histology sectioning. From a physical standpoint, the true margin is never assessed because a thin face margin has to be cut through in order to make the slide for examination.  Therefore, a true and complete assessment of all margins is never achieved. Serial sectioning allows CCPDMA approaches near-complete evaluation of the surgical margin and may be performed by pathologists, dermatologists, and surgeons.

Additional images

References 

Dermatologic procedures